Andinosaura laevis, the shiny lightbulb lizard, is a species of lizard in the family Gymnophthalmidae. It is endemic to Colombia.

References

Andinosaura
Reptiles of Colombia
Endemic fauna of Colombia
Reptiles described in 1908
Taxa named by George Albert Boulenger
Taxobox binomials not recognized by IUCN